Methodist Episcopal Church of West Martinsburg, also known as West Martinsburg Methodist Church, is a historic Methodist Episcopal church located at West Martinsburg in Lewis County, New York. It dates to about 1840 and is of frame construction with clapboard siding.  It is rectangular in plan with a simple gable roof.  It features a two-stage bell tower surmounted by a steeple.

It was listed on the National Register of Historic Places in 1983.

References

Churches on the National Register of Historic Places in New York (state)
Methodist churches in New York (state)
Federal architecture in New York (state)
Churches completed in 1840
19th-century Methodist church buildings in the United States
Churches in Lewis County, New York
National Register of Historic Places in Lewis County, New York